Jumaat Haji Adam (born 1956) is a botanist and taxonomist specialising in the carnivorous pitcher plant genus Nepenthes.  

Adam has described numerous Nepenthes taxa, mostly with C. C. Wilcock, including the species N. faizaliana and N. mapuluensis, as well as the natural hybrids N. × alisaputrana, N. × sarawakiensis, and N. × sharifah-hapsahii.

References

1956 births
Living people
20th-century botanists